Romanid is a zonal auxiliary language for speakers of Romance languages, intended to be understandable to them without prior study. It was created by the Hungarian language teacher Zoltán Magyar, who published a first version in May 1956 and a second in December 1957. In 1984, he published a phrasebook with a short grammar, in which he presents a slightly more simplified version of the language.

The language is based on the most common word senses in French, Italian, Portuguese and Spanish. It is rare, even in Hungary where it originated. According to the Russian newspaper Trud, Romanid, from a structural point of view, is "considerably simpler and easier to learn than Esperanto."

Example 
(1957 version)
 
(1984 version)
 
(translation)
 My language project called Romanid was published already in May of last year as a scientific study in Hungarian...

References

Literature 
 Zoltán Magyar. A Romanid nyelv rövid nyelvtana. Debrecen, 1958.
 Zoltán Magyar, "Mi az interlingvisztika? (A nemzetközi világnyelvekről)". In: Alföld, no. 8, 1965.
 Zoltán Magyar, Romanid. Tájékoztató és társalgási könyv, Kossuth Lajos Tudományegyetem, Debrecen, 1984.
 Zsuzsa Varga-Haszonits, "Romanid". In: István Fodor, A világ nyelvei. Akadémiai Kiadó, Budapest, 1999, pp. 1222–1223.

External links 
 Romanid Documentations Project 
 Grammatical Guide to the Romanid Language

Zonal constructed languages
Constructed languages
Constructed languages introduced in the 1950s